The Twenty-Five-Foot Space Simulator is a chamber for testing spacecraft in space-like conditions, including extreme cold, high radiation, and near-vacuum pressure. Built in 1961, it is located at the Jet Propulsion Laboratory in Pasadena, California. It has been used to prepare many American space probes for their launches, including the Ranger, Surveyor, Mariner, and Voyager spacecraft.

The first facility of its type, the chamber served as an example for other countries seeking to establish space programs. It was declared a National Historic Landmark in 1985 and is on the National Register of Historic Places.

Description
A series of lamps, lenses, and mirrors can irradiate the chamber with a directed beam of simulated solar energy in a variety of patterns and strengths. The chamber can be depressurized to 5×10−7 torr. Test objects can be mounted with a number of attachment points and methods. The chamber is mounted on a seismically isolated foundation. The chamber requires about 75 minutes to achieve a space-like environment, and about 2 hours to return to a normal environment. 

Next to the chamber is a clean room in which equipment can be prepared for testing.

See also
List of National Historic Landmarks in California
Space Environment Simulation Laboratory, built in 1965 at the Johnson Space Center in Texas

References

Jet Propulsion Laboratory
National Historic Landmarks in California
Buildings and structures on the National Register of Historic Places in Pasadena, California
Government buildings on the National Register of Historic Places in California
Buildings and structures completed in 1961
Buildings and structures in Pasadena, California
1961 establishments in California